Theda Ukena (1432 in Oldersum – 16 November 1494 in Greetsiel) was from 1466 to about 1480 regent of the County of East Frisia.

Theda was the granddaughter and heiress of the chief Focko Ukena (died 1436) and was born in 1432 in Oldersum as the daughter of Uko Fockena and Heba Attena of Dornum.  She was probably named after her grandmother Theda of Reide, the first wife of Focko Ukena.  Her father was assassinated in June 1432.

In 1455 she was second wife of Ulrich I Cirksena, who had been Count of East Frisia since 1454.  Between 1457 and 1465, they had six children: Heba, Gela, Enno I, Edzard I the Great, Ucko and Almuth.  Theda brought, among other claims, Oldersum into the marriage, which considerably weakened the ruling chief Wiard of Oldersum.

After Ulrich's death in 1466 she took over the official business of the house Cirksena. She was assisted by the chief Sibet Attena. She ruled until about 1480, when her sons Enno I and Edzard I came of age.

Theda died on 16 November 1494 in Greetsiel.

References and sources 
 Walter Deeter Theda, in: Biographisches Lexikon für Ostfriesland
  (Family Cirksena Article)
  (mention)
 

East Frisia
1432 births
1494 deaths
Theda
15th-century women rulers
Theda
Theda
15th-century German women
15th-century German people